is a Japanese footballer currently playing as a forward for Albirex Niigata (S).

Career statistics

Club
.

Notes

References

2002 births
Living people
Association football people from Shimane Prefecture
Japanese footballers
Japanese expatriate footballers
Association football forwards
Japan Soccer College players
Albirex Niigata Singapore FC players
Japanese expatriate sportspeople in Singapore
Expatriate footballers in Singapore